The Royal Today is a British medical soap opera, and a spin-off of the similarly themed drama, The Royal. The concept is that whilst The Royal is set in the late 1960s, The Royal Today featured the same hospital in the present day, with a new set of characters working in the same location. Each episode followed the events of a single day, and the show was broadcast daily (except for the weekends), so the series could be said to progress in real time.

The first series of 50 half-hour episodes began on 7 January 2008 on the ITV network airing from 4 pm-4.30 pm. Although there were a number of running storylines, the series generally eschewed the use of cliffhangers. The series was axed in March 2008 after poor ratings, on an average of 1.175 million viewers.

Cast and characters

Setting
There are two separate blocks at St. Luke's in Bradford used for shooting The Royal and The Royal Today. One of the previously unused blocks has undergone a makeover to transform it into a modern hospital, this also includes a bar area (seen in episode one) having been built. Exterior shots are filmed around North Yorkshire, particularly Scarborough. The last day of shooting the series was Friday 16 November 2007.

Named wards include:

Episode list

References

External links
 

Show information and cast interviews

2000s British television soap operas
2008 British television series debuts
2008 British television series endings
2000s British medical television series
ITV television dramas
Television series by ITV Studios
Television series by Yorkshire Television
Television shows set in Yorkshire
British television spin-offs